Monninger is a surname. Notable people with the surname include:

 Joseph Monninger (born 1953), American writer
 Nikki Monninger, American rock musician, member of Silversun Pickups

See also
 Menninger (surname)